Sakhalin International School is an international primary school in Yuzhno-Sakhalinsk sponsored by Shell.
There are approximately 180 children between 3 and 13 years of age on roll. There are 29 nationalities represented in the parent community.

History
The school was built to allow overseas expatriates' children to learn. 

As of March 2022, all of the students which have parents that work for Shell have left.

Campus
The school is located in the Zima Highlands housing development some fifteen minutes from the town of Yuzhno-Sakhalinsk. Next to the school there is a swimming pool, a large recreation center with a sports hall and other leisure facilities that are used frequently by the children, parents and teachers both as part of the school program and for leisure.

Curriculum
The school follows the International Early Year, Primary and Middle Years Curriculums. The language of instruction is English and where possible, children can follow a mother tongue language program. The additional languages supported directly by the school include Russian as an additional language and Dutch as a mother tongue (NTC). The school also supports those children for whom English is an additional language. Specialist teachers are employed to deliver these programs.

Extracurricular activities
After school activities organised for the children include arts and crafts, various sports, school drama performances and outdoor adventure activities such as hill walking and canoeing for the elder children who also take part in an annual adventure camp.

References

External links
 http://www.sakhalinschool.net/

British international schools in Russia
Yuzhno-Sakhalinsk